Branko Stinčić (17 December 1922 – 12 October 2001) was a Croatian football player.

Career
Born in Zagreb, Stinčić played for both Croatian derby sides in his career, first for Hajduk Split from 1946 to 1948 and then for Dinamo Zagreb from 1950 to 1953. With Dinamo he won the Yugoslav Cup in 1951.

He was capped once for Yugoslavia, in a friendly game against Norway on 23 August 1951, coming on as a substitute for Vladimir Beara in the 46th minute.

Personal life
He was father of Željko Stinčić, also a goalkeeper, who played for Dinamo Zagreb from 1967 to 1981, and who was also capped for Yugoslavia once in 1978.

References

External links
 
 Branko Stinčić at the Serbia national football team website 

1922 births
2001 deaths
Footballers from Zagreb
Association football goalkeepers
Yugoslav footballers
Yugoslavia international footballers
HNK Hajduk Split players
GNK Dinamo Zagreb players
NK Lokomotiva Zagreb players
Yugoslav First League players